The Alabama High School Athletic Association (AHSAA) is the governing body of athletic programs for junior and senior high schools in the U.S. state of Alabama. It conducts state championship competitions in all the AHSAA-sanctioned sports. Championship winners are:

Baseball

Basketball

Boys

Girls

Cross Country

Boys

† Co-Champions

Girls

*tie broken by best sixth-place finisher

Football

Playoff champions (1966–present)

† Co-Champions

Mythical champions (1920–1965)
Before the playoffs began in 1966, state champions were selected by The National Sports News Service.

† Co-Champions

Golf

Boys

† Co-Champions
*Sudden death playoff

Girls

*Sudden death playoff

Indoor track

Boys

† Co-Champions

Girls

† Co-Champions

Soccer

Boys

Girls

Softball

Fast Pitch

Slow Pitch

Swimming & Diving

Tennis

Boys

† Co-Champions

Girls

† Co-Champions

Track and Field

Boys

† Co-Champions

Girls

† Co-Champions

Volleyball

Wrestling

Traditional Tournament

† Co-Champions

References

External links
 Alabama High School Athletic Association

High school sports in Alabama